Liga Deportiva Universitaria de Quito's 2013 season was the club's 83rd year of existence, the 60th year in professional football, and the 52nd in the top level of professional football in Ecuador.

Club

Personnel
President: Carlos Arroyo
Honorary President: Rodrigo Paz
President of the Executive Commission: Esteban Paz
President of the Football Commission: Edwin Ripalda
Vice-President of the Football Commission: Patricio Torres
Sporting manager: Santiago Jácome

Coaching staff
Manager: Edgardo Bauza
Assistant manager: José Daniel Di Leo
Physical trainer: Bruno Militano
Goalkeeper trainer: Gustavo Flores
Statistician: Maximiliano Bauza

Kits

|}

Squad information
Liga's squad for the season is allowed a maximum of four foreign players at any one time, and a maximum of eight throughout the season. At the start of the season, Liga was mandated to start one under-18 player in each match. The jersey numbers in the main table (directly below) refer to the number on their domestic league jersey. The under-18 players will wear a jersey number of at least #50. For each CONMEBOL competition, Liga must register 25 players, whose jerseys will be numbered 1–25. Because of this, some players may have different jersey numbers while playing in CONMEBOL matches.

Note: Caps and goals are of the national league and are current as of the beginning of the season.

Winter transfers
In a press conference on December 18, 2012, Liga de Quito announced the signings of Carlos Arboleda of Deportivo Quevedo, Hugo Vélez of El Nacional and Koob Hurtado of LDU Loja. On the same day, Sporting Kansas City signed with Claudio Bieler as Designated Player. On December 19, 2012, Liga de Quito announced the signings of Carlos Feraud and Marco Mosquera of LDU Loja. On December 20, 2012, Liga de Quito announced the signings of Carlos Garcés and Francisco Rojas of Manta FC, Marco Posligua of Pilahuin, Yeison Ordóñez of Independiente José Terán and Johao Montaño of Deportivo Quito. In the same press conference, Ignacio Canuto was announced as the new foreign player of the team. On January 3, 2013, Liga de Quito announced the signings of José Madrid of El Nacional and Luis Saritama of Deportivo Quito.

Summer transfers
On April 16, 2013, veteran midfielder Patricio Urrutia announced his retirement from professional football. He played his last game on May 23. In a press conference on June 24, 2013, Liga de Quito announced the signing of Jaime Ayoví for one year on a loan from Club Tijuana.

Competitions

Pre-season friendlies

Other friendlies

Serie A

The 2013 season is Liga's 52nd season in the Serie A and their twelfth consecutive. The league season will run from late January to early December. The format is identical to the previous season.

First stage

Second stage

Copa Libertadores

Copa Libertadores squad

LDU Quito qualified to the 2013 Copa Libertadores—their 16th participation in the continental tournament—as 3rd place of the 2012 Serie A aggregate table and were given the Ecuador 3 berth. They entered the competition in the First Stage and were placed in Match G2 with Grêmio.

First stage

Tied 1–1 on aggregate, Grêmio won on penalties.

Patricio Urrutia testimonial match
In honor of his retirement, a testimonial match was held for long-time captain Patricio Urrutia. The match was contested between players of the 2008 Copa Libertadores winning squad, and members of the Ecuador national team. Urrutia played with each team. Important players of the 2008 Copa Libertadores squad as Claudio Bieler, Luis Bolaños, Joffre Guerrón and Diego Calderón could not participate of the match.

Note 1: Current LDU Quito player, but not part of the 2008 squad.
Note 2: Former LDU Quito player, but not part of the 2008 squad.
Note 3: Never played with LDU Quito.

Player statistics

Last updated: December 8, 2013Note: Players in italics left the club mid-season.Source:

Team statistics

Last updated: December 8, 2013 Source:Competitive matches

References

2013
Ecuadorian football clubs 2013 season